Temple of Congregation B'nai Jeshurun is a historic Reform synagogue in Lincoln, Nebraska. When it was built in 1923–1924, it replaced the old synagogue at 12th and D Streets completed in 1893. The main structure was designed in the Byzantine Revival and Moorish Revival styles by Davis & Wilson, and Meyer G. Gaba, a Professor of Mathematics at the University of Nebraska–Lincoln, designed the dome. Inside, the arch was designed by wood-carver Keats Lorenz. The first rabbi was Solomon Elihu Starrels. The building has been listed on the National Register of Historic Places since June 25, 1982.

References

National Register of Historic Places in Lincoln, Nebraska
Properties of religious function on the National Register of Historic Places in Nebraska
Synagogues completed in 1924
Reform synagogues in Nebraska
Moorish Revival architecture in the United States
Byzantine Revival architecture in the United States
Jews and Judaism in Nebraska
Byzantine Revival synagogues
Moorish Revival synagogues